The Networker is a family of passenger trains which operate on the UK railway system. They were built in the late 1980s and early 1990s by British Rail Engineering Limited (which became part of ABB in September 1992) and Metro Cammell. The trains were built for the Network SouthEast (NSE) sector of British Rail, which is where their name comes from. They are all multiple-unit trains.

History 
At the launch of Network SouthEast in 1986, the 'Networker' was announced. It would be a new family of trains, part of NSE's plan to modernise their network and replace older, often slam-door trains.

Unlike previous contemporary rolling stock units in Britain, Networker trains would use aluminium bodies to save weight, with some units featuring modern AC traction motors and air conditioning. The design was supposed to cover all requirements for future NSE multiple units, including new routes like the Channel Tunnel Rail Link. NSE planned a rolling programme of train replacement, ordering around 300 carriages a year.

Networker was originally intended to become one of the largest families of trains, bigger even than the largely Mark 3-based Second Generation. However, due to the recession in the early 1990s and the privatisation of British Rail from 1994, around 340 trains were built, substantially less than originally planned.

Variants

Diesel multiple units

Class 165 

The Class 165 is a 2- and 3-car diesel multiple unit (DMU), built for outer suburban workings. Thirty-nine units were built for the Chiltern subdivision of Network SouthEast in 1990 and 1991 (Class 165/0), and thirty-seven for the Thames subdivision in 1992 (Class 165/1). Since privatisation, the 165/0 units have been operated by Chiltern Railways, while the 165/1 units have been operated by Thames Trains, First Great Western Link, First Great Western and Great Western Railway in turn.

Class 166 

The Class 166 is a faster, air-conditioned variant of the Class 165, built for main line workings. Twenty-one 3-car units were built for the Thames and North Downs subdivisions of Network SouthEast in 1992 and 1993.

Electric multiple units

Classes 316 and 457 

These designations applied to a single four-car electric multiple unit (EMU), converted from former Class 210 carriages, that was used as a research prototype. The unit was numbered as a Class 457 unit for trials with power from 750 V direct current (DC) third rail on Southern Region lines, then as a Class 316 unit for trials with power from 25 kV alternating current (AC) overhead line equipment on lines north of the River Thames, for which one of its intermediate carriages was replaced with a Class 313 pantograph trailer.

Class 365 

The Class 365 was a dual-voltage EMU. The train was ordered in 1993, following a financial battle between NSE and InterCity for investment. Forty-one 4-car units were built from 1994 to 1995, the first sixteen fitted with pick-up shoes for power from  third rail on services between London and Kent, and the other twenty-five fitted with pantographs for power from 25 kV AC overhead line equipment on services on the East Coast Main Line from London King's Cross to Peterborough and King's Lynn. After use by a variety of operators, Great Northern withdrew its Class 365 fleet on 15 May 2021, and the fleet was subsequently scrapped.

Class 465 

The Class 465 is a four-car EMU, powered from  third rail. They were built by British Rail Engineering Limited (465/0), ABB (465/1), and Metro Cammell (465/2) in slightly different versions. Used by Network SouthEast, upon privatisation they passed to Connex South Eastern, then to South Eastern Trains then to Southeastern and are currently operated by SE Trains.

Class 466 

The Class 466 is a two-car EMU. It is powered from  third rail and used extensively in multiple with 4-car 465s to provide 6-car and 10-car formations. 43 units were built between 1993 and 1994 by Metro Cammell (who built the 465/2s) using GEC traction. The arrival of Class 376 Electrostar trains saw some units move to rural lines to operate 2-car shuttles, displacing half of the Class 508s.

Unbuilt

Class 171 
Class 171 was a long distance DMU that was proposed but never built. Originally, around seventy 'Turbo Express' trains were planned for long distance, unelectrified routes. However, Regional Railways had over-ordered Class 158 trains, and NSE agreed to take on the surplus units, introducing them from 1993 as Class 159 South Western Turbos. Therefore, Class 171 trains were no longer required.

Class 331 and 332 
Class 331 and 332 were two middle distance EMU types that were proposed and never built. 300 Class 331 'Networker LT&S' carriages were planned, as part of a 'Total Route Modernisation' of the London, Tilbury and Southend line. Instead, 74 Bombardier built Class 357 Electrostar trains entered service from 2000.

Twenty Class 332 'Networker Heathrow' trains were planned to be built for Heathrow Express services. Instead, 14 CAF built Class 332 trains entered service in 1998 on Heathrow Express services.

Class 341 and 342 

Class 341 and 342 were middle distance EMU types that were proposed but never built. Class 341 'Networker Crossrail' was intended to be the rolling stock for Crossrail prior to its cancellation in the early 1990s; the specifications for this class were later used in drawing up the rolling stock specifications for the current incarnation of Crossrail. Class 342 was intended for use on domestic services using the Channel Tunnel Rail Link when it opened in 1994. In the end these projects were cancelled, and no trains were constructed.

Class 371, 381 and 471 

Class 371, 381 and 471 were three long distance EMU types that were proposed but never built. Classes 371 and 381 were proposed as the "Universal Networker", a dual voltage train type for a multitude of services including Kent Coast, Great Northern, Thameslink and LTS routes. Class 471 was the proposed "main line Networker" intended for long-distance services from London to Kent and Sussex. The Class 365 train was ordered in 1993, instead of the upgraded Class 471 series. Following the privatisation of British Rail from 1994, no more trains were ordered.

Comparison

References 

British Rail brands
Multiple units of Great Britain
Train-related introductions in 1990